Daniel Joseph Cotter (April 14, 1867 – September 4, 1935), was a Major League Baseball pitcher who played with the Buffalo Bisons of the Players' League in . Cotter played in one game for the Bisons on July 16, 1890. He pitched a complete game, but allowed 18 hits, 7 base on balls, and 14 earned runs. He also went hitless at the plate in four at bats. Buffalo lost the game 19–0. Cotter later played for the Lewiston, Maine ballclub of the New England League in 1892.

References

External links

1867 births
1935 deaths
Major League Baseball pitchers
Buffalo Bisons (PL) players
19th-century baseball players
Baseball players from Boston
Lewiston (minor league baseball) players